The 2016 FedEx Cup Playoffs, the series of four golf tournaments that determined the season champion on the U.S.-based PGA Tour, was played from August 25 to September 25. It included the following four events:
The Barclays – Bethpage Black Course, Farmingdale, New York
Deutsche Bank Championship – TPC Boston, Norton, Massachusetts
BMW Championship – Crooked Stick Golf Club, Carmel, Indiana
Tour Championship – East Lake Golf Club, Atlanta, Georgia

These were the 10th FedEx Cup playoffs since their inception in 2007.

The point distributions can be seen here.

Regular season rankings

The Barclays
The Barclays was played August 25–28. Of the 125 players eligible to play in the event, five did not enter: Sergio García (ranked 20), Alex Čejka (59), Danny Willett (75), Shane Lowry (87), and Anirban Lahiri (117). Of the 120 entrants, 79 made the second-round cut at 145 (+3). Despite there being more than 78 players making the cut there was no secondary cut after the third round as in regular PGA Tour events, following a change made after the 2014 season.

Patrick Reed won by a stroke over Emiliano Grillo and Sean O'Hair and moved from seventh place to first place in the standings. The top 100 players in the points standings advanced to the Deutsche Bank Championship. This included five players who were outside the top 100 prior to The Barclays: Sean O'Hair (ranked 108th to 15th), Kang Sung-hoon (122 to 88), John Huh (111 to 90), Tyrone van Aswegen (104to 93), and Derek Fathauer (118 to 99). Five players started the tournament within the top 100 but ended the tournament outside the top 100, ending their playoff chances: Shane Lowry (ranked 87th to 102nd), Peter Malnati (93 to 104), Robert Streb (95 to 105), Lucas Glover (96 to 106), and Jonas Blixt (100 to 107).

The tournament was the last qualifying event for the eight qualifying places for the American team in the 2016 Ryder Cup.

Par 71 course

Deutsche Bank Championship
The Deutsche Bank Championship was played September 2–5. Of the 100 players eligible to play in the event, three did not play. Kevin Na (ranked 14) withdrew before the event because of the recent birth of his daughter. Alex Čejka (73) withdrew before the event with a lower back injury. Danny Willett (86) did not enter and played in the Omega European Masters instead. Of the 97 entrants, 72 made the second-round cut at 141 (−1).

Rory McIlroy won by two strokes over Paul Casey and moved to fourth in the standings. The top 70 players in the points standings advanced to the BMW Championship. This included six players who were outside the top 70 prior to the Deutsche Bank Championship: Billy Hurley III (77 to 51), David Hearn (92 to 59), Hudson Swafford (82 to 61), Vaughn Taylor (79 to 64), Chris Kirk (75 to 66), and Marc Leishman (71 to 70). Six players started the tournament within the top 70 but ended the tournament outside the top 70, ending their playoff chances: Ricky Barnes (68 to 71), Jerry Kelly (61 to 72), Martin Laird (63 to 77), Johnson Wagner (69 to 78), Colt Knost (65 to 79), and Chez Reavie (70 to 81).

Par 71 course

BMW Championship
The BMW Championship was played September 8–11. Of the 70 players eligible to play in the event, only Henrik Stenson (knee injury) did not play. There was no cut.

Dustin Johnson won by three strokes over Paul Casey. The top 30 players in the points standings advanced to the Tour Championship. This included four players who were outside the top 30 prior to the BMW Championship: Roberto Castro (53 to 21), Daniel Berger (31 to 26), J. B. Holmes (42 to 28), and Charl Schwartzel (43 to 30). Four players started the tournament within the top 30 but ended the tournament outside the top 30, ending their playoff chances: Rickie Fowler (22 to 31), Sergio García (25 to 32), Brooks Koepka (30 to 35) and Henrik Stenson (24 to 36).

Par 72 course

Reset points
The points were reset after the BMW Championship.

Tour Championship
The Tour Championship was played September 22–25. All 30 golfers who qualified for the tournament played, and there was no cut. Rory McIlroy won tournament and the FedEx Cup, beating Kevin Chappell and Ryan Moore in a playoff.

Par 70 course

Final leaderboard

For the full list see here.

Table of qualifying players
Table key:

* First-time Playoffs qualifier

References

External links
Coverage on the PGA Tour's official site

FedEx Cup
FedEx Cup Playoffs